Henrique Pinto Machado (12 February 1926 – 21 January 2009) was a former Portuguese footballer who played as a goalkeeper.

He was most known for his short three-year spell at Benfica, where he won the Portuguese Cup.

Career
Born in Alfarelos, Pinto Machado joined Benfica in 1946, making his debut on 24 November in a match against Porto. He battled with Martins for the goalkeeper position, playing the majority of his 14 appearances in the Campeonato de Lisboa. In his second season, the newly arrived Rogério Contreiras quickly overtook him in the pecking order, and Machado only played 11 games. 

In his last year at Benfica, he split the league appearances evenly with Contreiras, with each making 13. Nonetheless, his single game in the Taça de Portugal on 8 May 1949, against Marítimo, was enough for him to gain honours for winning the cup. He left Benfica to represent Naval for two seasons, moving to Mozambique afterwards.

Honours
Benfica
Taça de Portugal: 1948–49

References
General
 

Specific

1926 births
2009 deaths
Sportspeople from Coimbra District
Portuguese footballers
Association football goalkeepers
Primeira Liga players
S.L. Benfica footballers
Associação Naval 1º de Maio players